Hicham El Amrani (born November 25, 1985) is a Moroccan footballer.

International career
The defender played for Morocco at the 2005 FIFA World Youth Championship in the Netherlands.

References

1985 births
Living people
Footballers from Casablanca
Moroccan footballers
Morocco under-20 international footballers
Moghreb Tétouan players
Kawkab Marrakech players
Raja CA players
Wydad AC players
Association football defenders